Donald Malcolm (1930–2013) was a Scottish author of science fiction and fact who was active as a writer from the mid-1950s until the mid-1970s. Some of his nonfiction was written under the pen name Roy Malcolm.

Career
Malcolm's work was published in the magazines New Worlds, Nebula Science Fiction, Astounding Science Fiction, the anthology series New Writings in SF, and the anthologies Out of This World 4 (1964), Lambda I and Other Stories (1965), and Starfield (1989). His reviews appeared in the magazine Vector.

Much of Malcolm's short fiction falls into two sequences, the "Preliminary Exploration Team" and the "Dream Background" stories. Neither series has been collected. His novels, both published by Laser Books, have been described as "routine."

Later in life, Malcolm published a few pictorial history books about the town of Paisley in Renfrewshire, where he lived.

Bibliography

Science fiction

Novels
The Iron Rain (1976)
The Unknown Shore (1976)

Short stories
"Defence Mechanism" (1957)
"The Long Ellipse" (1958)
"The House of Lights" (1958)
"Lone Voyager" (1958)
"The Stuff of Dreams" (1959)
"Complex" (1959)
"Almost Obsolete" (1959)
"The Pathfinders" (1960)
"The Winds of Truth" (1960)
"Test Case" (1960)
"The Other Face" (1961)
"Yorick" (1962)
"Twice Bitten" (1963)
"Dilemma with Three Horns" (1964)
"Beyond the Reach of Storms" (1964)
"Potential" (1965)
"First Dawn" (1965)
"The Big Day" (1971)
"A Strange and Terrible Sea" (1974)
"The Enemy Within" (1975)
"Between the Tides" (1976)
"For Some Dark Purpose" (1989)

Nonfiction

Articles
"A Tenth Planet?" (1955)
"Is Bode's Law a Coincidence?" (1955)
"Lunar Observatory" (1956)
"Whose Moon?" (1956)
"Halley - The Man and the Comet" (1957)
"Satellites and the I.G.Y." (1957)
"Moons of Jupiter" (1958)
"First Breakthrough" (1958)
"Who Rules in Space" (1958)
"Fallacies in Science Fiction" (1963)

Reviews
" 'The Deep Reaches of Space' by A. Bertram Chandler" (1964)
" 'The View From the Stars' by Walter M. Miller" (1965)
" 'Raiders from the Rings' by Alan E. Nourse" (1965)

Notes

General references

1930 births
2013 deaths
Scottish science fiction writers
20th-century Scottish novelists
Scottish male novelists
20th-century British male writers